Shah Deccan Qutub Kokan Khwaja Pir Hafiz Habib Ali Shah was born in a Sufi family, whose lineage is traced back to Abu Bakr, the first Caliph of Islam, his ancestors were Sufi masters. From Syedna Abu Bakr Siddiq, the forefathers of Pir Khaja Habib Ali Shah    obtained the spiritual education (Tassawuf/Tariqat) and bestowed with Caliphat from their fathers

Early life
The birth of Khwaja Habib     was allegedly foretold by the Sheikh himself, who remarked that "his" son would be born in the home of Nawaab Ahmad Yar Khan (Mohi ud dowla). At this stage the mother of Khwaja Habib, Amatul Fatima was beyond child-bearing age, but since the sheikh had spoken, they believed that Allah willed otherwise.

In a couplet in Diwan Habib, Khwaja Habib Ali Shah exhibited love for his Sheikh Mohammed Hafiz Ali Shah Khairabadi the parental nobility and worldly life.  In his discourses he explained that the love and respect for the Sheikh the spiritual master.

"Kar Habib Apne Pidr aur na Madr pe Ghoooror, Ishq mein falan ibn falan haach hai haach"

English Translation of the Persian couplet:

"On your ancestry Habib be not proud aught. In the path of love So-and-So, is naught, is naught"

As predicted by Hafiz Pir Dastagir 2 years later, a male child was born as the fourth child of Nawaab Ahmad Yar Khan, as family tradition who was named Habib Yar Khan. In Hagiography "Tadhkiratul Habib" (memorial of the beloved) by Hafiz Muhammed Fuzail Bhayat Soofie Al Habibi, Durban, South Africa reported that at the time of the birth of Khwaja Habib a majzub stood at the door of the home in Kuch-e-Nasim Sultan (located near Machli Kaman near Charminar, Hyderabad) the palace of Nawab Ahmed Yar Khan (Mohi ud dowla), and pacing the floor in ecstasy repeatedly uttered "Shaykh Paida Shud" (English Translation: Sheikh has born)." It is to be noted according to the science of Abjad, the year of the birth of Khwaja Habib Ali Shah is "Ya Sayyid Habib Ali Shah Chishti"

Four years later, the grand Sheikh Hafiz Mohammed Ali Shah Kharaibadi visited Hyderabad. He knowingly enquired from Nawab Ahmed Yar Khan, "Well, well was not my child born at your home?" Nawaab Ahmed Yar Khan replied "Yes". Hafiz Pir Dastagir asked, "Well have you named him"? The Nawaab sahib replied in the affirmative. "What have you named him?" asked the Sheikh. The Nawaab sahib replied, "Habib Yar Khan Bahadur". Hafiz Pir Dastagir was very pleased and said, "I have come to perform the Bismillah (Tasmi khani) ceremony of my son". On 23 Shawal 1240 AH at the age of four years four months and four days, Hafiz Pir proceeded with the Bismillah of the child and thereafter put the child on test. A handful of gold coins and a handful of sweetmeats were placed in front of the child and he was asked by the Sheikh to choose that which he desired. The child (Khwaja Habib) placed his hands on both and said, "I will take both!". Upon this Hafiz Pir Dastagir smiled knowingly and declared, "My child will choose spirituality over wealth, and will be a wealth of spirituality"!.

After the official Bismillah ceremony, Khwaja Habib imitated the actions of his beloved Sheikh by learning and memorizing the verses, meanings and ultimately the secrets of the Quran.

Discipleship
Khaja Pir Habib Ali Shah    became the disciple of Shaikh ul Islam Hafiz Sayed Khaja Mohammed Ali Shah Khairabadi Chishti, Quadri, Soharwardy, Naqshbandi (also known as Hafiz Pir Dastagir),  who was the Calipha of Khwaja Suleman Tawsawi of Punjab, India (Now in Pakistan).

Education and training
At this tender age Khwaja Habib formally began the process of acquiring external as well as internal knowledge. By the age of six, Khwaja Habib would retire to the garden house, in a state of wudu, facing qiblah, covering his face with a cloth and would indulge in Muraqabah, in total privacy. By the age of nine, Khwaja Habib made it a consistent practice to be in a state of wudu. The obvious signs of wilayah affected his parents and other family members.

An anecdote narrated by several of his family members and Caliphas: During Id, Khwaja habib's father would listen to the requests of his children as to what they desired as gifts (iddi) on the occasion of happiness/id. When it came to the turn of Khwaja Habib tears would roll down his eyes and he would weep and request "My dear father, whenever you visit the Khaqah of my beloved Pir-o-Murshid (Sheikh){Hafiz Pir Dastagir}, grant me the privilege of accompanying you.".

After studying the Quran and the acquisition of the basic knowledge of Shariat, Khwaja Habib was formally initiated into Tariqa by Al Marifah Hafiz Mohammed Ali Shah (Hafiz Pir Dastagir) Khairabadi. Khwaja Habib took the bayath on the hands of his Pir at the age of sixteen years six months and eleven days on 30 Moharram ul Haram 1252 H. In one of the verses in Habibul Talibun Khwaja Habib explains the feelings As:

"Hum ko Hafiz ki Gali ka woh taswur banddha, Showk Janat na raha bagh Irum bhool gaye"

English Translation of the Persian couplet:

"In the thought of Hafiz's alley I was so lost, Desire for heaven, the Gardens of Irum I forgot"

Habib Ali Shah in his own words reported by his Calipha Shah Mohammed Ibrahim Soofie Habibi (whose Dargah Shareef is at Ajmer Shareef India). Afer Bayat I persistently requested from my parents to send me to the Khanqah of my Sheikh Hazrat Hafiz Pir Dastagir, but would receive no response from them. During that period a group of my spiritual brothers (Pir Bhais) was planning to visit the Sheikh in Khairabad. I secretly sent a petitionary letter by the hand of Hazrat Mirza Sardar Baig Sahib (whose Dargah Shareef is in Hyderbad, India).

When the entourage arrived in Khairabad, Hafiz Pir Dastagir was conducting a lesson. The entourage kissed his feet and musfah Hafiz Pir Dastagir adjourned the class (lesson) and asked whether all was well. Everyone replied in the affirmative, having completely forgotten about the letter in the excitement of their arrival at the Khanqah of their Pir. Finally Hafiz Pir Dastagir himself was compelled to ask, "Is there anything else? Is there no letter for me?" At that moment my letter came to mind and was presented to Hafiz Pir Dastagir. It is narrated that Hafiz Pir came forward, took the letter placed it on his head, held it to his chest, and wept profusely. After a while Hafiz Pir Dastagir regained his composure and opening his arms as if motioning to someone declared resolutely, "I will call him here " ! The highlights of this incident stated in the following verse by Khwaja Habib in his diwan :

"Shukr kya uska baja laya Habib Assi  - Ho gaya paesh nazar ye sag darban ka qat"

English Translation of the Persian couplet:

"How can gratitude be shown by Habib the sinner. Before his eyes was presented the lowly servant's letter"

The letter was taken and placed by Hafiz Pir Dastagir in his top pocket.

Khwaja Habib Ali Shah narrates in Diwan:

Naam sun ke wo Habib Ashiq Ka - Padh ke phir jaayb mein rakha Kagaz

English Translation of the Persian couplet:

Hearing the name of Habib the lover, In his pocket he kept the letter.

Khaja Pir Habib Ali Shah performed Hajj (in the year      )

Khaja Pir Habib Ali Shah spent years in the presence of Khaja Hafiz Mohammed Ali Shah Kharaibadi, in order to learn and gain the spiritual benefits (manasik), ultimately he was bestowed with the vision by the karam of Allah.

Books taught in Khanqa  Habibia

He established Khanqas (schools) in several cities of India.  He was the focal point for the people from various religions, caste, creeds, colours, languages.  They obtained his advise in spiritual development and understanding the Islam in right perspective.  He used to conduct classes of dars Quran and Hadis Nabawi.   Great attention was placed by him on the acquisition of knowledge of Sharia and of the intricate teachings of Tariqah. Lessons were not only given from the classical works of Awliay Allah such as “Fasusu Al Hikam”, “Ruh Ar Arwah”, “Mathanawi Shareef Moualana Rome ra”, “Jazb al Qulub”, “Kash al Mahjoub of Hazrat Data Ganj Bakhsh ra”, “Kashkol-e-Kalimi of Hazrat Shah Kaleem Ullah Shahanjebad wali ra” and various other classical works, but some of his own books’ such as Habib ul Talibun were specifically taught at the Khanqah.

Poetry

He wrote poetry in several languages:  Hindi, Urdu, Persian, Kokani. His poetry of Hindi, Persian and Urdu is still sung by Qawals.   His poetry contains homage to his Pir (Master) and other Sufi Saints of his order such as Shaikh Abdul Qadir Jilani and Khawajah Moinuddin Chishti of Ajmer, India.

One of his famous Urdu Couplet

"Hamari Kuchi bhi Nathi Haqeeqat, Tumhare Dar se mili hain Izzat,
Kharab hoone na dejo Sahib, Tumare dar ka bana huwa hunn"

English translation:

"We were nothing in reality, from your door we have attained dignity
Sir, Let us not ruined, At your door we have been fashioned."

Books written

He authored 30+ books in different languages but now being translated in Urdu and English by his disciples.

He designed syllabus and methodology for the teachings in  Khanqas which are still practiced and admired.  A possible module of “Theoretical Tasawwauf” could read like this and then a practical approach is done by the Pir (master) himself for disciples (Mureedin).

 Aqiqadah of Ahl Al Sunnah wal Jamaa’h
Dealing particularly with the contentious issues such as Tasawassul, Nida, Nadhr, Visitation of the Tombs of Awliay Allah, Urs of Awliay Allah are well defined in Habibul Inam.

 The Etiquette of Discipleship:
Respect, character development, conviction (yaqin) in the Murshid (Master), proper modes of conduct, basic house rules at a deverish lodge are defined in Habib al Talibun

 Mujahada against the Nafs and Shaytan:
Fighting off evil suggestions, resistance to succumbing to the temptations of the ego, fighting carnal basal desires, anger management, evils of arrogance, envy, ostentation, backbiting, slander, gluttony, apathy, refraining from Haram (restricted actions of Islam), are some of the topics that “Habib un Nasf fi Raddil Khnnas” and “Habibul Inam” addresses.
 
 Character Building & Personality Development:
Beautifying one's demeanour, speech, actions, imbuing sincerity, humility, tolerance, compassion, concern for the welfare of others, gratitude, patience are all fundamental lessons that “Habibul Muridin” discusses.

 Spiritual Practices:
Litanies, Nafl Salah (extra prayers), prescribed prayers Adhkar, Ashgal, meditation (Muraqaba), and the method of its performance, pitfalls of and obstacles in the path are taught in “Habibil Awrad” and “Habibul Adhkar”.

 Mystic Poetry and Literature:
Besides Mathnawi of Moulana Rumi, Diwan-e-Habib, Habibul Irshad, Fawaid Al Fuad, Awarif al Marif are some of the books that were widely read and studied.

Wisal (Died) in Bombay (Mumbai) and Tadfeen (Buried) in Hyderabad

Shah Deccan Qutub Konkan Pir Khaja Habib Ali Shah  died at Bombay, India on Thursday, 6th Dhul Hijjah 1323H, Thursday 1 February 1906 C.E., in the Khanqah which was established by him, a learning centre in Dockyard Road, Majgown, Bombay, India,   perpetuating the legacy of selfless service to humanity for which its founder was famous and now it visited by hundreds of people irrespective of religion, caste, creed or colour and all are benefitted by barakah of the Sufi saint.  It is a centre of communal harmony for the community, spreading the word of Islam.

It was decided that his body be taken to Hyderabad for burial by his second son Sajjadah Nasheen Pir Hafiz Ali Shah.   Funeral took three days to reach Hyderabad railway station (reached on 9th Dhul Hijjah 1323 H (3 February 1906 C.E.)) delay was due to multitudes of people that gathered at all railway stations along the route to pay their homage, respect and offer Salat ul Janaza for their honourable Sheikh.   At Hyderabad the funeral was received Pir Khaja Hidayat Ali Shah along with thousands of devotees and procession went to their home at Ghansi Bazar Hyderabad, India.

Salat ul Janaza was performed at renowned Makkah Masjid, Hyderabad, India, Masjid Ghansi Bazaar, Hyderabad, India, thousands of mourner(people) Muslims and non-Muslims, Mashaikhs, Ulemas, Scholars, Delegates from Nizam Government, Government Officials, students, disciples attended the funeral.  Immediate after Eid Salat (Namaz) Idd Adha in Masjid Habib Ali Shah Katalmandi, again Namaz janaza (salatul Janaza) Monday, 10h Dhul Hijjah 1323H, (Monday,  February 1906 C.E.) was performed led by his Pir-Bhai Moulana Hassan Uzzama Hafizi and buried at the spot he identified, in Kattalmandi then Ahmed Bagh, Hyderbad, India.

A beautiful tomb was built after few years of his demise, the design was given by one of his architect disciples for the Dargah Shareef (the same architect who designed Hyderabad High Court, now AP High Court)   Inside the tomb, on the grave a marble Masri was built,  on top of four sides the Darood Taj is engraved and at the foot (south side) Tariq wisal (demised date) is engraved as Thursday, 6th Dhul Hijjah 1323H, Thursday 1 February 1906 C.E.

Prediction of Pir Khaja Habib Ali Shah came true "Mubbarak ho idd-al-Zoha momineen,   ko mein tum par qurban ho jaata ho".    He wrote this complete ghazal. 
He was buried after Salatul Idd Al Adha at Katalmandi, Hyderabad, India.

At another occasion, he wrote a similar couplet:  "Mujda Suna Raha hoon Visaal sanam ka tum ko,   Ae Raz dan Hafiz Idd Zoha Mubbarak ".  

(I give you glad tidings of the beloved union.   O confidant of Hafiz on Idd ul Adha congratulations) ***Hafiz is His Pir Hazrat Mohammad Hafiz Ali Shah Kharaibadi ra)

He had predicted his burial day with the following verses and even identified the place of burial before departing for Bombay (Mumbai)of the last safar (Travel):

Silsila Habibia Across The Globe *World wide*

Hyderabad, India:   
Sajjada Nasheen Moulana Pir Khaja Habib Ali Shah Salis (Jawad Pasha) perform all the activities and monitor the Dargah Shareef and Masjid-e-Habibia functionality.
Hazrat Pir Ahsan Pasha Habibi{calipha of Hazrat Pir Khawaja Habib Ali Shah Thani ra}  is actively involved in spreading the teachings of Islam and principles of Silsila Habibia Nizamia. He performs all the rituals of Dargah Shareef in the absence of the present Sajjadah Nasheen. Hundreds of devotees and disciples visit the shrine each day and need to be catered to with proper guidance. Madrasa - Habibia is run by Habibi Education Society in the dargah premises. Chatti (6) shareef, Unnis (19) of every hegira calendar month from Asr to Maghrib Zikr and Sama conducted open to all.   Masjid Habib Ali Shah ra has 5 times prayers, juma, iddain and open 24/7/365 for the public. On auspicious days/nights special programs are conducted viz. Shab Miraj, Shab Baraat, Milad Shareef, Gyarweeh Shareef etc.

Bombay (Mumbai), India:  
Chilla mubbarak of Hazrat Khaja Pir Habib Ali Shah Chisti ul Quadri ra whose dargah-Mazar (grave) is in Hyderabad India. But the place he took last breath is a mausoleum built by his disciples in Bombay (now Mumbai). Now it is a place of many Islamic activities (Markaz), irrespective of Caste, religion, color people are benefiting for the past 100+ years from this small Khanqa Chillay mubbarak and Masjid (Madrasa) at Dockyard Road. Moulana Mohammed Hanif Gaya sahib {only son-in-law of Hazrat Khaja Habib Ali Shah Thani} was performing the rituals at the Khanqah in Dockyard Road, Mumbai. Now the son of Moulana Hanif Gaya ra Baba Hasham Gaya is performing the activities under the able guidance of his mother.  Monthly Chatti shareef, Milad Shareef, Gyaarweeh shareef are commemorated in the Chilla Mubbaarak.

Ajmer India:  
Hazrat Soofie Ibrahim ra a Calipha of Hazrat Khaja Habib Ali Shah ra was sent to Ajmer, he lived and died in Ajmer in compliance with the commandments of Khaja Habib ra. His mazaar is on the hillock adjacent to Dargah Shareef. Brother Hidayat Ali Habibi (he is also a Khadim of Khaja Sahib Dargah Shareef) is responsible for the activities of Silsila Habibia and Dargah Shareef of Hazrat Soofi Ibrahim Shah. He guides all the disciples of Silsila Habibia Nizamia upon their visit to Ajmer Shareef.
Moulvi Firasat Hussain Habibi sab, Khudam Association of Sarkar Hazrat Khaja Syed Moinduddin Chishti Gharib Nawaz ra, Ajmer Rajastan, India, Alhamdullilah he is actively involved in the work of Silsila Habibia helping the ziarain of Astaana Alia Gharib Nawaz ra.

Ahmednager, India:  
In Ahmednager is the beautiful Dargah Sharief of the Mureed and Khatim-ul-Khilafah of Hazrat Khaja Habib Shah Chishti Nizami ra, who is known as Hazrat Khwajah Peer Sayed Badruddin Ali Shah Chishti ra, commonly known Khwajah Sayed Faqir Muhammad Shah Chishti رحمت الله علیه. Guiding hundreds and thousands of people onto the right path,and towards the real purpose as a creation that is connecting with the creator Allah. Dargah Sharief is maintained by the family of Hazrat namely Sajjadah Nasheen Hazrat Sayed Mehboob Ali Shah Chishti Nizami and his children Sajjadah Nasheen Hazrat Sayed Mohsin Ali Shah Chishti Nizami Habibi,Peerzada Sayed Hafiz Ali Shah Chishti Nizami Habibi and Peerzada Sayed Asif Ali Shah Chishti Nizami Habibi. The progeny of Khawaja Faqir Muhammed Sha رحمت الله علیه are the current custodians of the Chilla mubbarak at Ahmednagar, India. They performs regular activities of the Silsila Nizamia Habibiya.

Toronto, Canada:  
Moulana Pirzada Alhaj Haamed Pasha Siddiqui Habibi (also known as Haamed Yarkhan, son of Hazrat Khizr Pasha Siddiqui Habibi ra (also known as Nawab Mujtaba Yarkhan) who was Calipha of Hazrat Maqdoom Pir Khaja Hafiz Ali Shah Sahib ra.  Haamed Pasha is a descendant, disciple, calipha in Silsila Habibia-Nizamia, Chishtiul Quadri, Naqshbandi. He studied Arts and Law majoring in Muslim Law and studied Tafseer Quran Al Kareem with Hazrat Alhaj Qazi Ahmed Basheeruddin Farooqi Quadri (Calipha of Hazrat Abdul Qadeer Siddiqui Hasrat ra).   He was trained by two of his paternal uncles who were renowned Sufia and Mashaikh of the recent past {His Pir Hazrat Pir Khaja Habib Ali Shah Sani ra and Alhaj Hazrat Mehmood Pasha Quadri Takht Nasheen ra}. He is studying Quranic Arabic Grammar with Moulana Arshad Basheer Madani sab. He is a bilingual speaker, and from time to time he delivers Juma Khutba and leads Idd Prayers in Toronto, Canada. He is actively serving the community in accordance with the Sufi teachings of love and equality, communal harmony and performing the activities of Silsila Habibia.  He is active member of Khudame Auliay Canada, Islamic Will Canada, Bazme Nizamia Canada,Bazme Khawjagan, Budah Spiritual Association, Islamic Will Canada etc.

Recognising his services Hazrat Sheikh Alhaj Pir Syed Aziz Nizami (Sajjada Nasheen Dargah Shareef Hazrat Syed Khaja Nizamuddin Mehboob Ilahi (New Delhi)honored him with a shawl (Khirqa Mubbark) in public during the Urs celebration of Mehboob Ilahi ra in Toronto, Canada on Saturday 13 March 2016.

Jeddah, Saudi Arabia:  
Alhaj Sartaj Pasha Siddiqui Habibi (also known as Kaleem yarkhan), who is the nephew of Hazrat Pir Khaja Habib Ali Shah Sani ra, is representing Silsila Habibia Nizami and performs the activities (weekly Halaqa and zikr Mahfil, conduct Khatam Khajagaan programs from to time) of the silsila alia for the past 2+ decades.

South Africa:  
Hazrath Shah Goolam Muhammad Soofie Saheb ra was sent by Khwaja Habib Ali Shah ra to South Africa in 1895. There, he established 12 Masaajid under the name "Habibia". After Hazrath Soofie Saheb's demise in 1911, his two eldest sons, Hazrath Shah Muhammad Ibrahim Shah Saheb Soofie and Hazrath Shah Abdul Aziz Dadajaan Soofie served as Sajjada Nasheen of the Darbaar and the Habibi Silsila in South Africa.  There are numerous schools are run under the umbrella of Silsila Habibia in South Africa. 

Hazrat Shah Mufti Goolam Muhammad Soofie Salis Habibi who is currently the Sajjada Nasheen of the Darbaar of Hazrath Soofie Saheb and the Chishti Nizami Habibi Silsila South Africa. He is assisted by two deputies, Hazrath Shah Mufti Muhammad Farouq Soofie Siddiqi and Hazrath Shah Mufti Muhammad Ebrahim Soofie Siddiq

The Chishti Habibiya Silsila is also carried out by the Progeny of Hazrat Khawaja Sayed Faqir Muahmmed sha under the banner of Bazm e Chiraag e Faqir Chishti International which was founded by Hazrat Khawaja Sayed Mehboob Ali Sha  Chishti Nizami Fakhri Sulemani Hafizi Habibi Faqiri رحمت الله علیه and is buried in Cape Town. Currently Bazme Chirag e Faqir Chishti International is run by Sajjada Nasheen Hazrat Sayed Mohsin Ali Sha Chishti Nizami Fakhri Sulemani Hafizi Habibi Faqiri Mehboobi, Peerzada Hazrat Sayed Hafiz Ali sha Chishti Nizami Fakhri Sulemani Hafizi Habibi Faqiri Mehboobi and Peerzada Hazrat Sayed Asif Ali Sha Chishti Nizami Fakhri Sulemani Hafizi Habibi Faqiri Mehboobi.

Dargah and Khanqa Activities at Hyderabad, India

All activities are monitored and led by current Sajjada Nasheen Moulana Pir Khaja Habib Ali Shah Salis (Moulana Jawad Yar Khan).
   Madrasa Habibia Habibia Education Society, in the Masjid and Dargah premises (boys, girls and adults) free Quranic and Islamic coaching is provided. 
   On every Thursday - Khattam Khajagaan is performed Asr to Maghrib. 
   Recitation of Darood Shareef, dua and Chirgah is performed at Maghrib every day 
   6th of Lunar Hijrah Month, Chhati Shareef  For Hazrat Syed Moinuddin Gharib Nawaz ra and Hazrat Khaja Habib Ali Shah ra
   19th of Lunar Hijrah Month, Fateha of Mohammed Hafiz Ali Shah (Hazrat Hafiz Pir Dastagir ra Khairabadi)   
   19th D. Qudah Annual Urs Shareef Hazrat Hazrat Mohammed Hafiz Ali Shah Hafiz Pir Dastagir ra, Khairabadi)  
   17th R.Sani - Annual Gyarweeh Shareef (Fateha of Hazrat Sheikh Syed Abdul Khader Jeelani Ghouse Pak ra). 
   12th R.Awal - Annual Milad Shareef (Our beloved messenger Hazrat Mohammed Mustafa saw) 
   Every 29th day of Lunar Hijrah - monthly Fateha of Hazrat Sheikh Syed Abdul Khader Jeelani Ghouse Pak ra).
   Irrespective of Caste, Religion, Colour and Creed, people visit his grave and get benefitted and time to time langer is served.
   Even today the dargah premises is the evidence of human unity and communal harmony.

Annual Urs at Hyderabad

 Ghusl Shareef on 29th D. Qudah
 Sandal Shareef on 3rd D. Hijjah - procession starts from Qadam Rasool (Panja Shah) from the middle of the city it reaches to Dargah Shareef just before Isha.  After Sandal Mali and Isha langar is distributed.   Followed by Jalsa Seerathul Awlia in Masjid Khaja Habib Ali.
 4th D. Hijjah - 1st day of Chirag - Majlis sama with prayers break and Langar
 5th D. Hijjah - 2nd day of Chirag - After Salat ul Zohar Mehfil Sama in the adjacent Hall where the daughter of Habibi Ali Shah, Bibi Begum Vicraunnisa ra is buried.
 After Asr Majlis Sama in Sama Khana with proper Salat breaks and langar
 6th D. Hijjah Quran recitation from Fajr to 9:10 am - at sharp 9:10 am (local time) Khatam Quran starts, brief sama mehfil - then flowers are offered at Dargah Shareef
 At Baitul Habib- Gaddi Mubbarak and Malida taqseem (distribution of Tabbark). Then men walk to Dargah Yousufian, offer Flowers on the Dargah of Syed Yousufuddin and Syed Shareefuddin. Then visit the mazaar(tomb) of Pirani maa sahib (Wife of Hafiz Pir Dastgir) who was buried in the dargah premises. The fateha and flowers are offered and then brief SAMA is performed and tabarruk distributed.

Urs Shareef ceremony begin from Qadam Rasool on 3rd D. Hujjah and end at Dargah Yousufian on 6th D. Hijjah.  People from various parts of the world attend the Urs Shareef and get benefitted (In addition to the zairain from various parts of India, people from South Africa, England, Kenya, Pakistan, Bangla Desh, UAE, Muscat are seen). It will be difficult to get a hotel accommodation during Urs Shareeef in the vicinity of Dargah Shareef.  
    
All the Urs ceremonial functions are performed and conducted by the current Sajjada Nasheen Habib Ali Shah Salis(Jawad Yar Khan)

 Urs Shareef is celebrated across the globe,  on 6th D.hijjah according to the local calendar, custom, the activities might differ but
Shajra Mubbarak is recited everywhere.

Published works
Habibul Taliban
Habib un Nas fi Radd il Khannas
Diwan e Habib

References

3 .Hazrat khaja habib ali shah  katalmandi (Abids) by www.auliadeccan.com

External links
  
  
 
 
 
 
 
 
 
 
 
 
 
   goto to page 17
 
 http://www.chisti-faqiri.org/wp-content/uploads/2015/07/Hazrat-Sayed-Faqir-Muhammad-Shah-R.A.pdf

Indian Sufis